Say No to Murder is a book written by Nancy Pickard and published by Pocket Books (now owned by Simon & Schuster), which later went on to win the Anthony Award for Best Paperback Original in 1986.

References 

Anthony Award-winning works
American mystery novels
1985 American novels